Gijsbertus Jacobus "Bert" Sas (1 August 1892–20 October 1948) was the Netherlands military attaché in Berlin at the time of the German invasion of the Netherlands in May 1940.

Sas was born in Leeuwarden, Netherlands. He was named after his father, a soldier who by his pension had reached the rank of lieutenant colonel. His mother Geertrui Huiber was 20 years younger than her husband.

Sas was the youngest of 3 children, and attended a secondary school in Leeuwarden. In 1910 he went to the Koninklijke Militaire Academie in Breda. During World War I, in 1917, he was promoted to first lieutenant and married Maria Johanna van der Minne. From 1923 until 1926 he followed the training for staff officier at the Hogere Krijgsschool. After this he obtained another staff function in The Hague. In 1928 he was promoted to the rank of captain and became head of the most important bureau of the 2nd division where all of the important military questions were handled. However, during the period from 1928 until 1936, military expenditure was strictly limited.

Between 1936 and 1937 he was the military attaché in Berlin for 10 days per month, spending the remaining 20 days in The Hague. He was then recalled to The Hague, where he functioned as the right-hand man of General Reijnders in the role of head of the operations division.

In March 1939, following the German annexation of the Sudetenland, Reijnders sent him back to Berlin. This time he set up residence there with his wife Miep.

In Berlin he immediately restored his friendship with the German colonel Hans Oster. Oster had obtained an important position as the right hand of Wilhelm Canaris at the German Abwehr, the espionage and counter-espionage service of the army.

They were connected not only through their mutual dislike for the Nazi regime. Their friendship dated from the beginning of the 1930s, when they first met, possibly when Sas was working in The Hague.

Oster passed him all important information that he obtained. He did not do this out of sympathy for Sas, but because he considered it his duty to Germany. He did not see himself as a traitor, but someone who did his duty to the decent Germany that he loved.

At end of August 1939 he warned The Hague that a war with Poland was about to begin. He gave 25 August 1939 as the invasion date, but this date passed by. At 14:50 on that day Hitler gave the order for the invasion, but revoked it when he heard that England was not going to concede. Sas' credibility suffered. When he reported on 31 August that the war was now close, the head of intelligence, Van der Plassche did not believe him. Sas was the only one who delivered this report: London and Paris gave reassurance. However the Netherlands mobilised at the insistence of Queen Wilhelmina.

General Reijnders, still his superior in The Hague, was positive over Sas' information. His relationship with General Reijnders remained good as long as the neutrality of  Netherlands was not discussed.

During September and October 1939, Sas obtained more signals that the neutrality of the Netherlands would not remain inviolate. Oster, during this time, assured him that only Belgium would be the target. However Sas did not believe this. At his insistence, Oster obtained further information from the German headquarters in Zossen. This showed that the suspicions that Sas now had were correct: the Netherlands would be invaded together with Belgium.

The violation of neutrality would not be limited to a passage through southern Limburg into Belgium.

Sas died in the 1948 KLM Constellation air disaster in Prestwick, Scotland.

1892 births
1948 deaths
Royal Netherlands Army personnel
Dutch people of World War II
People from Leeuwarden
Recipients of the King Haakon VII Freedom Cross
Graduates of the Koninklijke Militaire Academie
Victims of aviation accidents or incidents in 1948
Victims of aviation accidents or incidents in Scotland
Military attachés
Dutch expatriates in Germany